Burundi competed at the 2012 Summer Olympics in London, United Kingdom from 27 July to 12 August 2012. This was the nation's fifth appearance at the Olympics.

Comité National Olympique du Burundi sent a total of six athletes to the Games, 4 women and 2 men, to compete only in athletics, judo, and swimming. Swimmer Elsie Uwamahoro was the only athlete in the team to participate in her second Olympics. Marathon runner Diane Nukuri, the oldest athlete of the team, made an Olympic comeback in London after a twelve-year absence, and reprised her role as Burundi's flag bearer at the opening ceremony.

Burundi, however, failed to win a single Olympic medal in London. Track runner Francine Niyonsaba qualified for the final rounds in the women's 800 metres, but narrowly missed out of the nation's first ever medal after 16 years, finishing abruptly in seventh place.

Athletics

Athletes have achieved qualifying standards in the following athletics events (up to a maximum of 3 athletes in each event at the 'A' Standard, and 1 at the 'B' Standard):

Men

Women

Key
Note–Ranks given for track events are within the athlete's heat only
Q = Qualified for the next round
q = Qualified for the next round as a fastest loser or, in field events, by position without achieving the qualifying target
NR = National record
N/A = Round not applicable for the event
Bye = Athlete not required to compete in round

Judo

Burundi has had 1 judoka invited.

Swimming

Burundi has gained two "Universality places" from the FINA.

Men

Women

See also
 Burundi at the 2012 Summer Paralympics

References

External links 
 
 

Nations at the 2012 Summer Olympics
2012
Olympics